Epilepsy & Behavior is a bimonthly peer-reviewed medical journal covering behavioral aspects of epilepsy. The journal was established in 2000 and is published by Elsevier. The editor-in-chief is Steven Schachter (Harvard University). According to the Journal Citation Reports, the journal has a 2013 impact factor of 2.061.

References

External links 

Elsevier academic journals
Epilepsy journals
Bimonthly journals
Publications established in 2000
English-language journals